Ahmed Firoz Kabir is a Bangladesh Awami League politician and the incumbent Member of Parliament of Pabna-2.

Career
Kabir was selected  to parliament from Pabna-2 as a Bangladesh Awami League candidate 30 December 2018.

References

Awami League politicians
Living people
11th Jatiya Sangsad members
Year of birth missing (living people)
People from Sujanagar Upazila